Efon is a Local Government Area of Ekiti State, Nigeria. Its headquarters are in the town of Efon-Alaaye.

It has an area of 232 km and a population of 86,941 at the 2006 census.

The postal code of the area is 362.

References

Local Government Areas in Ekiti State